Noël Meyer (born 20 April 1988) is a South African male javelin thrower, who won an individual gold medal at the Youth World Championships.

References

External links

1988 births
Living people
South African male javelin throwers